Mikyoung Kim, FASLA is an American landscape architect, urban designer, and founding principal of Mikyoung Kim Design.  Kim has received the Smithsonian Cooper Hewitt Award and the American Society of Landscape Architects National Design Medal.  Her studio was named by Fast Company as one of the world's most innovative architecture firms.

Early life and education
Mikyoung Kim was born in Hartford, Connecticut . She initially aimed for a career as a concert pianist until she developed tendinitis in her early 20s.

While at Oberlin College, Kim also studied sculpture. She graduated with a BS in Sculpture/Art History in 1989. She subsequently studied landscape architecture at Harvard Graduate School of Design, graduating in 1992. At Harvard, she studied concurrently at the GSD and at the MIT VES (Visual and Environmental Studies) department, developing designs, sculpture, installations and videos. While at Harvard, she was the Norman T. Newton Scholar and received the Jacob Weidenmann Prize for Design.

Work

Mikyoung Kim Design 
Kim's projects include the ChonGae Canal restoration in Seoul, Korea the Crown Sky Garden in Chicago, IL the Chicago Botanic Garden, the Plaza at the Prudential at 888 Boylston in Boston, the John Hancock Tower Roof Garden in Boston, MA, and Pier 4 Seaport Plaza in Boston, MA. The firm is best known for designing healing gardens, including the Crown Sky Garden at the Ann & Robert H. Lurie Children's Hospital of Chicago, the Boston Children's Hospital Longwood Entrance, and the Miami Healing Garden at the Jackson South Community Hospital. The ChonGae Canal in Seoul, South Korea opened in 2005. The Canal includes the conversion of one of the city's polluted waterways into a local amenity that attracts 90,000 pedestrians a day.

Teaching 
In 1994 she became a full time faculty member at the Rhode Island School of Design  and opened her own firm in Boston, MA. She was a professor at Rhode Island School of Design from 1994 to 2012 and was the Department Head at RISD for five years. She has taught a variety of design and sculpture studios and seminars. Since 2012, Kim has held a Professor Emerita position. She has also taught at the Harvard Graduate School of Design from 2017 to 2018 as a Design Critic in Landscape Architecture. In Fall 2018 Kim held the Glimcher Distinguished Visiting Professor at the Knowlton School of Architecture at The Ohio State University.

Recent Awards 
Cooper Hewitt, Smithsonian Museum National Design Award for Landscape Architecture

American Society of Landscape Architects Design Medal

2019: Mikyoung Kim Design awarded Fast Company Worlds Most Innovative Companies - Architecture

AD Innovator by Architectural Digest

2017: ASLA National Honor Award, Chicago Botanic Garden, Glencoe, USA

2010: Veronica Rudge Green Prize in Urban Design, Harvard University for ChonGae Canal in Seoul, South Korea - Architecture

References

External links
 Mikyoung Kim Design Homepage

Harvard Graduate School of Design alumni
Rhode Island School of Design faculty
Living people
Oberlin College alumni
Year of birth missing (living people)
Urban designers
Women landscape architects
Environmental artists